JME or Jme may refer to:

Academic journals
 Journal of Management Education
 Journal of Medical Ethics
 Journal of Molecular Evolution
 Journal of Monetary Economics

People
 Jme (musician) (born 1985), English grime MC and record producer
 J-Me (born 1985), Burmese rapper

Technology
 Java Platform, Micro Edition, a Java platform designed for embedded systems
 JME Molecule Editor, a Molecule Editor applet
 jMonkeyEngine, a Java scenegraph API

Other uses
 Juvenile myoclonic epilepsy, a neurological disease